James Ennis may refer to:

 James Ennis (cricketer) (1900–1976), Irish cricketer
 James Ennis III (born 1990), American basketball player
 Jim Ennis (born 1967), Canadian ice hockey player

See also
James Innes (disambiguation)